Zymer Bytyqi (born 11 September 1996) is a professional footballer who plays as a winger for Super League Greece club Olympiacos. Born in Belgium to Kosovan parents and raised in Norway, Bytyqi plays for the Kosovo national team.

He previously played for Sandnes Ulf and Red Bull Salzburg, and became the youngest player that has ever played in the Norwegian top league when he made his first-team debut in 2012 (the record has since been broken by Martin Ødegaard).

Club career

Early career and Sandnes Ulf
Bytyqi was born in Belgium to Kosovar immigrants, but moved to Norway at the age of 2. He did not play football before he was 10 years old, when he started to play for Lura IL before he moved to Sandnes Ulf ahead of the 2010 season. In 2011, he played several matches for Sandnes Ulf's reserve team in the Third Division. He also trained with the first team but was ineligible for play in the First Division because of his young age. He gave an impressive performance for Norway U15 in September 2011, partly by scoring the winning goal in one of the matches, and joined Newcastle United on a week-long trial in October 2011. His agent, Jim Solbakken, stated that despite the interest from bigger clubs, it would be best for Bytyqi's development to stay at Sandnes Ulf.

Bytyqi signed a professional one-year contract with Sandnes Ulf in January 2012, and head coach Asle Andersen said that he had never seen such a talented striker, and that he would get his chance in Tippeligaen, following Sandnes Ulf' promotion to the top league. Bytyqi played for Sandnes Ulf during their pre-season, and he also scored a goal in the 6–0 win against Randaberg. After a very solid game for Norway U16 in April 2012, Sandnes Ulf's Director Tom Rune Espedal confirmed interest from English, German and Dutch clubs, but that no club had yet made an offer for Bytyqi, and that they most likely would sell the talented player during the summer. Bytyqi stated that his big dream was to play professionally abroad, but that he wouldn't leave Norway without his family.

When Sandnes Ulf's forwards Tommy Høiland, Vetle Myhre and Gilles Mbang Ondo was out with injury, Bytyqi was included in the squad for the match against Haugesund on 28 May 2012, and made his debut for Sandnes Ulf when he came on as a substitute in the 77th minute. This made him the youngest player in the top league of Norway, aged 15 years, 261 days, beating Sverre Økland's (aged 16 years and 1 day) old record from 2009. The record was broken on 13 April 2015, when Martin Ødegaard made his debut for Strømsgodset aged 15 years and 118 days.

In August 2012, Bytyqi was called up for the Norwegian U16-team, a decision that neither Sandnes Ulf or the player was happy about, as Bytyqi could have played the league-game against Lillestrøm and even made his first appearance in the starting line-up due to injuries.

Red Bull Salzburg and return to Sandnes Ulf as loan
On 23 August 2012, Bytyqi signed a three-year precontract with Austrian Bundesliga club Red Bull Salzburg and this transfer would become legally effective in January 2013. Red Bull Salzburg reportedly paid a 5 million krone transfer fee. On 9 March 2013, he was sent back on loan to Tippeligaen club Sandnes Ulf for the remainder of the season. On 1 May 2013, he played the first game after the return in the 2013 Norwegian Cup second round against Flekkerøy after being named in the starting line-up.

Viking
On 6 January 2015, Bytyqi signed a three-year contract with Tippeligaen club Viking and received squad number 27. Three months later, he made his debut in a 1–0 away defeat against Mjøndalen after coming on as a substitute at 70th minute in place of Samuel Adegbenro.

Konyaspor
On 8 January 2021, Bytyqi signed a two-and-half-year contract with Süper Lig club Konyaspor and received squad number 14. Two days later, he made his debut against Fatih Karagümrük after coming on as a substitute at 75th minute in place of Deni Milošević, and assists in his side's only goal during a 2–1 away defeat.

International career
From 2011, until 2015, Bytyqi has been part of Norway at youth international level, respectively has been part of the U15, U16, U17, U18, U19 and U21 teams and he with these teams played 44 matches and scored 7 goals. Whereas, on 2 March 2014, Bytyqi received a call-up from Kosovo for the first permitted by FIFA match against Haiti, and made his debut after coming on as a substitute at 57th minute in place of Ilir Azemi.

Career statistics

Club

International

Scores and results list Kosovo's goal tally first, score column indicates score after each Bytyqi goal.

Honours
 Viking
 1. divisjon: 2018
 Norwegian  Cup: 2019

References 

1996 births
Living people
People from Sandnes
Kosovan footballers
Norwegian footballers
Association football wingers
Kosovo international footballers
Norway under-21 international footballers
Norway youth international footballers
Sandnes Ulf players
FC Red Bull Salzburg players
Viking FK players
Konyaspor footballers
Eliteserien players
Norwegian First Division players
Süper Lig players
Kosovan expatriate footballers
Norwegian expatriate footballers
Expatriate footballers in Austria
Kosovan expatriate sportspeople in Austria
Norwegian expatriate sportspeople in Austria
Expatriate footballers in Turkey
Kosovan expatriate sportspeople in Turkey
Norwegian expatriate sportspeople in Turkey